Pygospina is a genus of delphacid planthoppers in the family Delphacidae. There are about five described species in Pygospina.

Species
These five species belong to the genus Pygospina:
 Pygospina aurantii (Crawford, 1914)
 Pygospina reducta Caldwell in Caldwell & Martorell, 1951
 Pygospina rezendensis (Muir, 1926)
 Pygospina spinata Caldwell in Caldwell & Martorell, 1951
 Pygospina spinigera (Fennah, 1945)

References

Further reading

 
 
 
 

Articles created by Qbugbot
Auchenorrhyncha genera
Delphacini